Marguerite-Julie-Antoinette Houdon (1771 – 1795) was a French painter.

She was the first cousin of the sculptor Jean-Antoine Houdon and her self-portrait was included in the 1905 book Women Painters of the World.

References

1771 births
1795 deaths
French women painters